The similarly named Biblical books are located at Books of Kings.

The Book of the Kings of Israel is a non-canonical work referred to in the Hebrew Bible (e.g. ). The King James Version of this passage reads: 
"So all Israel were reckoned by genealogies; and, behold, they were written in the book of the kings of Israel and Judah, who were carried away to Babylon for their transgression. Now the first inhabitants that dwelt in their possessions in their cities were, the Israelites, the priests, Levites, and the subjects (netinim)."

Other versions, e.g. the New King James Version, make clear the scope of the book was the kings of Israel:
... they were inscribed in the book of the kings of Israel. But Judah was carried away captive to Babylon because of their unfaithfulness.

"Now the rest of the acts of Jehoshaphat, first and last, behold, they are written in the book of Jehu the son of Hanani, who is mentioned in the book of the kings of Israel."

 and  refer to the Book of the Kings of Israel and Judah:
"The other events in Jotham's reign, including his wars and other things he did, are written in the book of the Kings of Israel and Judah."

Basel theologian Hans-Peter Mathys considers the expressions to be "factually identical".

References

See also 
Table of books of Judeo-Christian Scripture
Books of Chronicles

Lost Jewish texts